Temenggong Tun Abdul Jamal bin Tun Abbas (1720 – 1802) was the first Temenggong of Johor. He is noted to be the direct ancestor to the current Sultan of Johor and the descendants of the House of Temenggong.

History
Abdul Jamal was born in the Johor Sultanate in 1720 to his father Bendahara Tun Abbas of Pahang, the son of the Sultan Abdul Jalil Shah IV, who died on 21 November 1721.

In 1757, he was appointed by his brother, Sultan Sulaiman Badrul Alam Shah as the Temenggong for the Johor Sultanate. The office would become hereditary among his direct descendants.

He died in Pulau Bulang, Kepulauan Riau in 1802 and was buried there, on a burial ground which would later known as Makam Temenggung Abdul Jamal. His son Tun Abdul Hamid was installed by his grand-nephew Sultan Mahmud Ri’ayat Shah as the next Temenggong of Johor.

Legacy
Certain locations were named after him at Kepulauan Riau:
 Makam Temenggung Abdul Jamal and Masjid Temenggung Abdul Jamal at Pulau Bulang, Kepulauan Riau, Indonesia
 Temenggung Abdul Jamal Stadium and Temenggung Abdul Jamal Indoor Stadium at Batam, Kepulauan Riau, Indonesia

References

1720 births
1802 deaths
House of Temenggong of Johor